Sabal is a genus of palms (or fan-palms) endemic to the New World. Currently, there are 17 recognized species of Sabal, including one hybrid species. The species are native to the subtropical and tropical regions of the Americas, from the Gulf Coast/South Atlantic states in the Southeastern United States, south through the Caribbean, Mexico, and Central America to Colombia and Venezuela. Members of this genus are typically identified by the leaves which originate from a bare, unarmed petiole in a fan-like structure. All members of this genus have a costa (or midrib) that extends into the leaf blade. This midrib can vary in length; and it is due to this variation that leaf blades of certain species of Sabal are strongly curved or strongly costapalmate (as in Sabal palmetto and Sabal etonia) or weakly curved (almost flattened), weakly costapalmate, (as in Sabal minor). Like many other palms, the fruit of Sabal are drupe, that typically change from green to black when mature.

Species

 Sabal × brazoriensis D.H.Goldman, Lockett & Read (S. minor × S. palmetto) - Texas

Prehistoric taxa
Extinct species within this genus include:
 Sabal bigbendense  Manchester et al. 2010†
 Sabal bracknellense (Chandler) Mai†
 Sabal grayana  Brown 1962†
 Sabal imperialis  Brown 1962†
 Sabal jenkinsii† (Reid & Chandler) Manchester†

Formerly placed here
 Serenoa repens (W.Bartram) Small (as S. serrulata (Michx.) Nutt. ex Schult. & Schult.f.)

Fossil record
These plants lived from the late Cretaceous to the Quaternary period (from 66 million to 12 thousand years ago). Fossils have been found in United States, Italy, Switzerland, Germany, Japan, the United Kingdom, and France. Leaf fossils of †Sabal lamanonis have been recovered from rhyodacite tuff of Lower Miocene age in Southern Slovakia near the town of Lučenec.27 million years old †Sabal lamanonis and †Sabal raphipholia leaf fossils in volcanic rocks have been described from the Evros region in Western Thrace, Greece.

Phylogenetic work in Sabal (1990s – present) 
The name Sabal was first applied to members of the group by Michel Adanson in the 18th century. Previous names that this genus was associated with include Corypha, Chamaerops, Rhapis. This section highlights important phylogenetic work done within the genus Sabal.

In 1990, Scott Zona outlined key morphological and anatomical characters that he used to analyze species relationships of Sabal. Through this analysis of characters, Zona produced a cladogram that portrays evolutionary relationships amongst 15 species of Sabal. Based on the distribution of species within his cladogram, Zona  recognized four distinct clades. The clades within his study include (Clade 1) Sabal minor; (Clade 2) Sabal bermudana, Sabal palmetto, Sabal miamiensis, and Sabal etonia; (Clade 3) Sabal maritima, Sabal domingensis, Sabal causiarum, Sabal maurittiformis, Sabal yapa, Sabal mexicana, and Sabal guatemalensis; (Clade 4) Sabal uresana, Sabal rosei, and Sabal pumos. These clades associate closely with geographic distributions. All of the species within Clade 3 occur in the Greater Antilles and southern Mexico, where species that occur in the Greater Antilles are more closely related to each other than those that occur in southern Mexico. Although Clade 4 also occurs in Mexico, these species occur on the west coast where they are geographically separated from the Mexican species within the southern part of the country. The remaining two clades, Clade 1 and Clade 2 predominantly occur in the southeastern United States although S. palmetto and S. minor are also known from Cuba and the Bahamas (S. palmetto) and northern Mexico (S. minor). Sabal bermudana is only known from the Bermuda Islands.

In 2016 Heyduk, Trapnell, Barrett, and Leebens-Mack conducted a new study on Sabal that analyzed molecular (e.g. nuclear, plastid) data from 15 species of the group. This study incorporated plastid and nuclear sequence data that together were used to estimate the relatedness between the species of Sabal. The results of the study show species relationships to be different from the distribution of Zona's cladogram. Within the framework of this study, a major difference between the results of Zona and this study is the placement of "Clade 4" (Sabal uresana, Sabal rosei, and Sabal pumos) which split and integrate these species throughout the phylogeny of Sabal. The largest of the clades identified by Zona, "Clade 3" is disrupted significantly as it is split into multiple clades. Although Sabal causiarum and S. domingensis retain their relationship as sister species, they are included in a clade that also includes S. maritima and S. rosei. Despite these disruptions in placement between these two studies, the overall integrity of "Clade 1" and "Clade 2" is in congruence with the clades established from the molecular data.

Pollinators and parasitoids 
Sabal species are used as food sources by several species of birds including Mimus polyglottos, Turdus migratorius, Dendroica coronata, Corvus ossifragus, and Drycopus pileatus, Caryobruchus, and various species of hymenoptera. Bears (Ursus americanus) and racoons are also known to feed on fruit of various species of Sabal. Sabal palmetto is recorded to have its own lichen, Arthonia rubrocincta, that only occurs on the leaf bases of the Cabbage Palm (Sabal palmetto). In Europe, the introduced Lepidopteran species Paysandisia archon has become a prominent pest whose larvae are known to feed on some of the cultivated species of Sabal.

Uses
Arborescent species are often transplanted from natural stands into urban landscapes and are rarely grown in nurseries due to slow growth. Several species are cultivated as ornamental plants and because several species are relatively cold-hardy, can be grown farther north than most other palms. The central bud of Sabal palmetto is edible and, when cooked, is known as 'swamp cabbage'. Mature fronds are used as thatch, to make straw hats, and for weaving mats.

Symbolic use
A silhouette of a palmetto (S. palmetto) appears on the official flag of South Carolina.

Two images of S. palmetto appear on the Florida state seal.

Sabal palmetto is the state tree of both Florida and South Carolina.

References

External links
 Sabal images at Fairchild Tropical Botanical Gardens
 Sabal at Scanpalm

 
Arecaceae genera
Neotropical realm flora
Taxa named by Michel Adanson